Aníbal Gerson González Ramírez (born 8 April 1995) is a Mexican former footballer who played as a striker.

Personal life
He is the son of the top-goalscorer of O'Higgins, Aníbal González and was born when his father played for Monterrey.

References

External links
 
 Aníbal González at PlaymakerStats

1995 births
Living people
Sportspeople from Monterrey
Mexican footballers
Chilean footballers
Mexican people of Chilean descent
Citizens of Chile through descent
Sportspeople of Chilean descent
O'Higgins F.C. footballers
Colo-Colo footballers
Chilean Primera División players
Association football forwards
Mexican expatriate sportspeople in Chile
Expatriate footballers in Chile
Naturalized citizens of Chile